Potassium manganate is the inorganic compound with the formula . This green-colored salt is an intermediate in the industrial synthesis of potassium permanganate, a common chemical. Occasionally, potassium manganate and potassium permanganate are confused, but these compounds's properties are distinct.

Structure and bonding
 is a salt, consisting of  cations and  anions. It is isostructural with potassium sulfate. The compound is paramagnetic, owing to the presence of one unpaired electron on the Mn(VI) center.

Synthesis
2 MnO2 + 4 KOH + O2 → 2 K2MnO4 + 2 H2O
The transformation gives a green-colored melt. Alternatively, instead of using air, potassium nitrate can be used as the oxidizer:

One can test an unknown substance for the presence of manganese by heating the sample in strong KOH in air. The production of a green coloration indicates the presence of Mn. This green color results from an intense absorption at 610 nm.

This reaction illustrates the relatively rare role of hydroxide as a reducing agent.

The one-electron reduction of permanganate to manganate can also be effected using iodide as the reducing agent:

The conversion is signaled by the color change from purple, characteristic of permanganate, to the green color of manganate. This reaction also shows that manganate(VII) can serve as an electron acceptor in addition to its usual role as an oxygen-transfer reagent. Just like ,  exhibits low solubility in virtually all solvents.

An easy method for preparing potassium manganate in the laboratory involves heating crystals or powder of pure potassium permanganate. Potassium permanganate will decompose into potassium manganate, manganese dioxide and oxygen gas:

This reaction is a laboratory method to prepare oxygen, but produces samples of potassium manganate contaminated together .  The former is soluble and the latter is not.

Reactions

Manganate salts readily disproportionate to permanganate ion and manganese dioxide:

The colorful nature of the disproportionation has led the manganate/manganate(VII) pair to be referred to as a chemical chameleon. This disproportionation reaction, which becomes rapid when [] < 1M, follows bimolecular kinetics.

See also
 Category:Manganates for a list.

Sources

Holleman, A. F.; Wiberg, E. "Inorganic Chemistry" Academic Press: San Diego, 2001. .

External links
National Pollutant Inventory - Manganese and compounds Fact Sheet

Manganates
Potassium compounds